Mir Mukhtar Akhyar (1653–1719)() was a Sufi scholar of the  Noorbakshi orders of the Sufi in Baltistan. He shaped the social complexion of the valley. Akhyar was the son of Abu Saeed Sauda (An early Muslim scholar of baltistan and kashmir.) He established 12 Khanqah around Baltistan. Akhyar translated the book Fiqh-i-Ahwat (the book of jurisprudence) also known as the Siraj-ul-Islam  written in Arabic by his teacher Shah Syed Muhammad Nurbakhsh Qahistani. His grave is located in Keris, Khaplu.

References 

People from Gilgit-Baltistan
17th-century Muslim scholars of Islam
Indian Sufi saints
History of Baltistan
People from Ghanche District
1653 births
1719 deaths